Victor Heintz (November 20, 1876 – December 27, 1968) was from 1917 to 1919 a one-term U.S. Representative from Ohio. He was a highly decorated veteran of World War I.

Early life and career 
Born on a farm near Grayville, Illinois to German immigrants, Heintz attended the public schools. He graduated from the University of Cincinnati in 1896 and from its law department in 1899. He was admitted to the bar in 1898 and commenced practice in Cincinnati, Ohio. He served six years in the Cavalry and Infantry of the Ohio National Guard.

Congress 
Heintz was elected as a Republican to the Sixty-fifth Congress (March 4, 1917 - March 4, 1919).
He was not a candidate for renomination in 1918.
During the First World War, he absented himself from the House and was commissioned a captain in the One Hundred and Forty-seventh Regiment, United States Infantry, on August 4, 1917.

World War I

He went overseas June 22, 1918, and served until the end of the war.
Decorated with the Distinguished Service Cross with Oak Leaf Cluster, Silver Star Medal, Purple Heart, and the Croix de Guerre.

Later career and death 
He served as vice president and secretary of Ohio Valley Real Estate Co..

He resumed the practice of law until his retirement in 1961.

Death
He died in Cincinnati, Ohio, December 27, 1968.
He was interred in Armstrong Chapel Cemetery, Indian Hill, Ohio.

Medals
  Distinguished Service Cross with Oak Leaf Cluster
  Silver Star 
  Croix de guerre
  Purple Heart

Sources

References

External links

1876 births
1968 deaths
Ohio lawyers
Politicians from Cincinnati
United States Army personnel of World War I
American people of German descent
University of Cincinnati College of Law alumni
Recipients of the Silver Star
Recipients of the Distinguished Service Cross (United States)
United States Army officers
Recipients of the Croix de Guerre 1914–1918 (France)
People from Grayville, Illinois
Republican Party members of the United States House of Representatives from Ohio
Military personnel from Illinois